Jennifer McGregor may refer to:
 Jennifer McGregor (curator)
 Jennifer McGregor (soprano)